The Blue Party, also known as the National Liberals and nicknamed together The Tailless, was a historical Dominican political party from the late 19th century to the mid 20th century.

The name of the party came from the popularity of rooster fighting in the late 19th and early 20th century, and Bolos literally means Tailless. The Blue Party was banned in 1930 after Rafael Trujillo’s coup. Founded by intellectuals, Santo Domingo liberals, merchants and large peasant proprietors, it does not technically have an ideological heir, although the Liberal Party of the Dominican Republic tends to identify with a similar type of liberalism.

See also
:Category:Blue Party (Dominican Republic) politicians
History of the Dominican Republic

References

Defunct political parties in the Dominican Republic
Liberal parties in North America
Defunct liberal political parties
Anti-clerical parties
National liberal parties
Radical parties
Banned political parties